Royston is a town and civil parish in the District of North Hertfordshire and county of Hertfordshire in England.

It is situated on the Greenwich Meridian, which brushes the town's eastern boundary, and at the northernmost apex of the county on the same latitude as towns such as Milton Keynes and Ipswich.

Before the boundary changes of the 1890s, the boundary between Hertfordshire and Cambridgeshire ran east–west through the centre of town along the middle of Melbourn Street.  The town has a population of 15,781 as of 2011.

History

The town grew at the crossing of two ancient thoroughfares, Ermine Street and the Icknield Way (cum Ashwell Street); the former was created after the Roman conquest, while the Icknield Way has long been accepted as a prehistoric routeway. The roads are sometimes called military roads as they were prepared or improved by Roman soldiers to facilitate access to the hinterland of Roman Britain. The path of Icknield Way is occupied by the present day A505, which bypasses the town to the north. The A10 follows the alignment of Ermine Street south of the town, but diverts before it reaches the crossroads. The A1198, known as the Old North Road follows the alignment of Ermine Street northwards. Barrows on Goffers Knoll and Therfield Heath are evidence of prehistoric settlement.

A cross, variously known as Royse's, Rohesia's, or Roisia's Cross, was erected by the crossroads at an unknown date. It gave the settlement its earliest name of Crux Roesia or Roisia's Cross. By the 14th century this had become Roisia's Town, Roiston or Royston. A large boulder of red millstone grit, bearing a square socket, supposed to be the base of the cross, has been placed by the cross roads at the northern end of High Street.

Until 1540 Royston was divided between five parishes: Barkway, Reed and Therfield in Hertfordshire and Melbourn and Kneesworth in Cambridgeshire. In that year it became a separate ecclesiastical parish, partly in each county.

Ralph de Rochester founded the Augustinian priory which originated as a chapel for three canons and was later expanded to seven or more regular canons. Royston had two hospitals or free chapels, as well as the monastery.

The hospital of St John and St Thomas was founded for lepers in 1224 by Richard Argentine, Sheriff of Cambridgeshire on the south side of Baldock Street.

The hospital of St Nicholas was situated in the Cambridgeshire side of Royston. It was founded in about 1200 probably by Amphelise, a daughter of Richard the Chamberlain. In 1213 King John granted a fair to celebrate the feast of St Nicholas (8–9 May). The patronage of the hospital descended to Sir Giles Argentine, lord of the manor of Melbourn, who also held the patronage of the other hospital. In the 14th century, St Nicholas' Hospital was put under the same jurisdiction as that of St John and St Thomas, which were subsequently suppressed in 1547.

The town having lost its monastic charter, the priory site was obtained by Robert Chester, a gentleman of the bedchamber to Henry VIII, who set up a market. Much of the town was given over to inns catering for travellers mainly travelling between London and York.

On 29 April 1603 James VI and I, travelling to Westminster to be crowned as King of England, stayed overnight at the Chester residence. His grandmother Mary of Guise had stayed there in 1551. Attracted by the suitability of the area for hunting, James hired the house for a year. In 1604 he decided to create a royal hunting lodge in the town by demolishing the "Cock" and "Greyhound" inns. The king's lodgings were completed in 1607 and were described in 1652 as "all of brick well-tiled double-built, in length 78 ft., breadth 43 ft., height from eaves to ground 24 ft., thickness of walls 24 inches." The buildings were never big enough to cater for a full court, but provided a suitable spot for hunting, near enough to London for convenience and far enough away to deter intrusion. King James ordered a strict prohibition on anyone taking game from within  of Royston, and an elaborate infrastructure was established to support him in the pursuit of his sport. He returned almost every year to hunt and shoot.

Queen Anne and Henry Frederick, Prince of Wales, visited the town once, in 1611–1612. The next year, the queen opposed the marriage of her daughter Princess Elizabeth to Frederick V, Elector Palatine, but the king came to Royston with the Earl of Rochester to negotiate the dowry, and a marriage contract was signed there. Following the marriage, celebrated on St Valentine's Day 1613, the king, Prince Charles, and Frederick came to stay at Royston.

James's successor, King Charles I, visited Royston less often than his father. In June 1647, during the English Civil Wars, Charles was brought through the town as a prisoner of the Parliamentary army. After Charles's execution, the royal buildings fell into disrepair. The Crown sold its last interests in the town in 1866.

William Cobbett mentions the town (somewhat gloomily) in his Rural Rides:

After you quit Ware...the land grows by degrees poorer; the chalk lies nearer and nearer to the surface, till you come to the open common-fields within a few miles of Royston [which] is at the foot of this high poor land; or, rather in a dell, the open side of which looks towards the North. It is a common market town. Not mean, but having nothing of beauty about it... 

Royston had a local bank, called the Royston Bank, from about 1806 to 1896, when it merged into the grouping that became Barclays. It was founded by Edward King Fordham and others, and the business was run by the influential local Fordham family.

The Church of England parish Church of St John the Baptist, Royston, Hertfordshire was severely damaged by a fire that broke out in the early morning of 9 December 2018, with the blaze destroying part of the roof and bell tower. Initially thought to be arson, a police investigation later concluded this not to be the case.

Governance

Royston has three tiers of local government at parish (town), district and county level.

Town council
Royston Town Council was formed in 1974 as the successor to Royston Urban District Council. The council consists of fifteen councillors headed by a town mayor. The councillors are elected for three wards named Heath, Meridian and Palace. Among the town council's responsibilities are allotments, Royston Cave, Royston Museum, local festivals, public halls and the town's war memorial. 
In December 2007 Royston Town Council was awarded the nationally recognised status of Quality Town Council. This Award confirms that Royston Town Council is run in accordance with the high standards required by the National Association of Local Councils and other government bodies.

Coat of arms
The town council uses the coat of arms granted to the urban district council in 1952. The blazon of the arms is:Argent a fesse gules thereon another chequy of the first and sable in chief two Tudor roses barbed and seeded and in the base a stag trippant the whole surmounting an archiepiscopal staff, all proper. And for a crest on a wreath of the colours, perched upon a representation of the Royse Stone, a hooded crow proper.

The symbols on the shield briefly illustrate the history of the town. The staff is for Royston Priory, the roses for Tudor connections, while James I is represented by the checky fesse of the Stewarts. The hart represents Hertfordshire. The crest depicts a hooded crow, known within the region as a "Royston crow". He stands on the "Royce Stone" in the town centre.

Royston First
In October 2008, the Royston First Business Improvement District (BID) was proposed. It came into operation in April 2009 after a ballot of local businesses. A second such ballot in 2014 granted the organisation a further five-year mandate until April 2019.

District council
Since 1974 Royston has formed part of the non-metropolitan district of North Hertfordshire. The council is based at Letchworth, and also includes the towns of Baldock and Hitchin. There are 49 district councillors elected for 24 wards. The three wards of Royston Heath, Royston Meridian and Royston Palace return 2 councillors each. As of 2019 four councillors are members of the Conservative Party and two are Liberal Democrat.

County council
Hertfordshire County Council has 78 councillors, of which two are elected for Royston and the surrounding area. One of the current councillors (as of 2019) is a member of the majority Conservative group whilst the other is a member of the Liberal Democrat group.

Administrative history

Parish
The parish of Royston was created in 1540 from parts of the parishes of Barkway, Reed and Therfield in Hertfordshire and Melbourn and Kneesworth in Cambridgeshire. The county boundary was not changed at that time, so the new parish straddled Hertfordshire and Cambridgeshire.

In 1835 the Royston Poor Law Union was created, covering a number of parishes in Hertfordshire, Cambridgeshire, and Essex. A workhouse was built on Baldock Road in Royston, opening in 1836. Under the Public Health Acts of 1872 and 1875 the board of guardians of the poor law union was given public health and local government responsibilities for the area, which was thereafter also called the Royston Rural Sanitary District. In 1878 they applied for powers to create a special drainage district for the town of Royston. By this time the urban area of the town extended beyond the Tudor parish boundaries, and so the special drainage district was drawn to also include parts of the neighbouring parishes of Bassingbourn, Kneesworth, and Melbourn in Cambridgeshire and Therfield in Hertfordshire. The special drainage district came into operation on 16 June 1879.

Royston Urban District (18971974)

Under the Local Government Act 1894 rural sanitary districts became rural districts from 28 December 1894. Where rural sanitary districts straddled county boundaries, as Royston Rural Sanitary District did, they were to be split into separate rural districts in each county, unless boundaries were otherwise adjusted. A joint committee of Hertfordshire and Cambridgeshire County Councils held inquiries during 1894 trying to reach agreement as to how best to deal with Royston. No solution that would keep the town together could be found that was acceptable to the two county councils. Therefore, when the Local Government Act came into force at the end of the year, Royston parish was split along the county boundary through the middle of the town into a Royston (Hertfordshire) parish and a Royston (Cambridgeshire) parish. The Hertfordshire parts of the Royston Rural Sanitary District, including the Royston (Hertfordshire) parish, became the Ashwell Rural District, whilst the Cambridgeshire and Essex parts of the rural sanitary district, including the Royston (Cambridgeshire) parish, became the Melbourn Rural District. The Royston Special Drainage District was likewise split into a North Royston Special Drainage District and a South Royston Special Drainage District, with the two areas being administered by the new rural district councils.

The question of how the town of Royston should be governed took another couple of years to resolve. Competing proposals were put forward from the two county councils, with both Cambridgeshire and Hertfordshire wanting the whole town. Eventually, the Local Government Board directed that town should all be placed in Hertfordshire, and on 30 September 1896 the parish of Royston (Cambridgeshire) and the parts of the Cambridgeshire parishes of Bassingbourn, Kneesworth, and Melbourn that were within the North Royston Special Drainage District were transferred to Hertfordshire. As a temporary measure, these areas became the parishes of North Royston, South Bassingbourn, South Kneesworth, and South Melbourn, and were all included within the Ashwell Rural District pending such time as Hertfordshire County Council was able to establish an urban district for the town. On 1 October 1897, a year and a day after the county boundary change, an urban district was established for Royston, at which point Royston ceased to be part of the Ashwell Rural District. The new urban district of Royston covered the parishes of Royston, North Royston, South Bassingbourn, South Kneesworth, South Melbourn, and the part of Therfield parish in the South Royston Special Drainage District, in effect giving the new council the same boundaries as the original special drainage district of 1879. The area also became a single parish called Royston, governed by the urban district council.

Royston Urban District Council held its first meeting on 1 October 1897 at the Institute on Melbourn Street. The first chairman of the council was Joseph Phillips, a Conservative, who was also the chairman of the Royston Board of Guardians and the Ashwell Rural District Council. Royston Urban District Council purchased the Institute in 1900, renaming it Town Hall.

A coat of arms was granted to Royston Urban District Council on 19 May 1952.

Royston Urban District Council was abolished under the Local Government Act 1972, becoming part of North Hertfordshire on 1 April 1974. Royston Town Council was created on the same day as a successor parish to the former urban district council. The Town Council continues to be based at Town Hall.

Geography
The town lies on the northern slopes of the Hertfordshire Chalk Downs. The Greenwich Meridian passes through the point where the bypass meets the original A505 alignment. The town centre is just 1-minute 27 seconds west of the meridian.

Transport
Royston sits at the junction of the A10 and A505 roads, both of which are important road links through Hertfordshire and beyond.  The town is also convenient for fast links to London and the north, as it is only a short distance from both the A1(M) and M11 motorways.

Nearby air transport links include Luton and Stansted airports, both of which are major air hubs in the South of England.

Royston railway station provides direct commuter links to both London and Cambridge. It is on the Cambridge Line and is a stopping point for regular services operated by Govia Thameslink Railway.

Royston railway crossing

A new rail crossing for pedestrians and cyclists was opened in 2012. The crossing links the northern part of the town with the leisure centre and the main complex of schools. Two options were proposed, a bridge with an estimated cost of £1.5m and the eventually successful subway option estimated at £3.25m. Two locations were also under consideration; one at the 'Coombes Hole' allotment gardens area and a second connecting Green Street and Morton Street. Sustrans elected to build a subway at Coombes Hole allotment gardens.

In 2007 the scheme became one of 79 Sustrans Connect2 projects to receive Big Lottery funding. The Connect2 project makes reference only to the subway option.

Schools
Royston's schools are arranged as follows:

First Schools (Years Reception–4) : Icknield Walk First School; Roman Way Academy; Studlands Rise First School; Tannery Drift First School.
Middle and Upper schools (Years 5–11): King James Academy Royston
Colleges (Years 12–13): there aren't any currently
Additionally there is St Mary's Roman Catholic Primary School (Years N-6)

Landmarks

The public open space and nature reserve of Therfield Heath (also known as Royston Heath) overlooks the town from a hill to the south-west.

In 1742 a strange cave carved out of the chalk was discovered in the centre of Royston. Royston Cave is located underneath the central crossroads of the town. The carvings in the cave have led to much speculation about the origin and function of the cave.

Popular culture
Royston Arts Festival was revived in 2007 and now runs annually around the last week of September or the first week of October. Royston Town Band is a brass band that was founded in the mid-19th century as the Royston Volunteer Band. The band celebrated its 150th anniversary in 2014.

The Battle of Royston was a fictional battle in William Le Queux' The Invasion of 1910. The book describes how a German Army invades England through East Anglia and marches on London. Royston is where a battle takes place which fails to halt their advance.

In the 1965 fictional children's television series, Thunderbirds, one eccentric puppet character who was involved in a rescue mission was called Deborah the Duchess of Royston. The episode was called "The Duchess Assignment".

Royston is a named location toward the end of the novel About a Boy, but is not named in the film adaptation.

Royston is the hometown of Dr. Sharon on Ted Lasso.

Town partnerships
Royston and District Twinning Association coordinates twinning relationships with the following partner towns:
 Großalmerode, Hessen, Germany
 La Loupe, Eure-et-Loir, France
 Villanueva de la Cañada, Comunidad de Madrid, Spain

Sport and leisure
Royston Golf Club is situated on the Therfield Heath and was established in 1892.  Has 18 holes, a range of practice facilities, pro shop and welcoming clubhouse.

Royston has a Non-League football club, Royston Town F.C., which plays at Garden Walk. The football club currently plays in the Southern League Premier Division Central league.
 
Royston Sports Club, situated on the heath, is the home to the town's tennis, squash, hockey and rugby clubs, as well as youth football. Royston Rugby Club's 1st XV play in the Herts/Middlesex 1st division – its Girls' U15 side won the Herts Shield in 2011 and 2012.

Notable people
Several musicians originate from Royston, including:
 Trumpeter Alison Balsom,
 Blues singer/guitarist Danny Bryant, 
 Singing coach Carrie Grant, 
 Husband and wife William Barrington-Coupe and Joyce Hatto, perpetrators of "the greatest hoax in classical music", moved to the town. A film was made by Victoria Wood about their life together in 2012 called Loving Miss Hatto.
 Theologian, and founder of Presbyterianism in England, Thomas Cartwright, is reported to have been born in Royston, and fellow theologian Edward Stallybrass. 
 William Morton, theatre manager, born in 1838, grew up in Royston. Morton Street was named after his father, George, a leading light in the Royston Tradesmens' Benefit Society. 
 Theatre director Robin Belfield, and meteorologist Simon King grew up in Royston. 
 Poet Thomas Peyton, and anatomical modeller Joseph Towne were both born in the town. Astronomer and astrologer 
 Henry Andrews moved to Royston in 1766 and is buried in the graveyard of St John's Church. 
 British author Helen Bailey was a resident of the town at the time of her murder in April 2016. 
 Thomas Kefford (fl. 1710–1750), a noted English clockmaker, ran his business at The Dial, Fore Street, in Royston.

References

External links

 Royston town council

 
Towns in Hertfordshire
Civil parishes in Hertfordshire